Sangharama (Sanskrit: संघराम Saṃgharāma) refers to a "temple" or "monastery." It is the place, including its garden or grove, where the Sangha, the Buddhist monastic community dwells. A famous sangharāma was that of Kukkutarama in Pataliputra. The Kukkutura sangharāma was later destroyed and its monks killed by Pushyamitra Shunga, according to the second century Ashokavadana. "Then King Pushyamitra equipped a fourfold army, and intending to destroy the Buddhist religion, he went to the Kukkutarama. (...) Pushyamitra therefore destroyed the sangharāma, killed the monks there, and departed."

Notes

Buddhist temples